Defying Gravity may refer to:

Film and television
 Defying Gravity (1997 film)
 Defying Gravity (2008 film)
 Defying Gravity (TV series), a 2009 drama television series

Music
 "Defying Gravity" (song), a song from the Broadway musical Wicked
 Defying Gravity (Keith Urban album), 2009
 Defying Gravity (Mr. Big album), 2017
 Defying Gravity (The Sherbs album), 1981
 Defying Gravity (Vinnie Moore album), 2001
 Defying Gravity, an album by John Elefante, 1999
 "Defying Gravity", 1976 Jesse Winchester song covered by
Emmylou Harris on the 1978 album Quarter Moon in a Ten Cent Town 
Jimmy Buffett on the 1976 album Havana Daydreamin'
Waylon Jennings on the 1987 album Hangin' Tough